Sorkhu (also Romanized as Sorkhū; also known as Sorkh Āb) is a village in Chehel Chay Rural District, in the Central District of Minudasht County, Golestan Province, Iran. At the 2006 census, its population was 62, in 21 families.

References 

Populated places in Minudasht County